Fraccionamiento Ruta 84, also called Casarino, is a populated area composed of several fragments on both sides of Route 84, southwest of the town of Joaquín Suárez and east of Toledo in the Canelones Department, Uruguay. It is part of the wider Montevideo Metropolitan Area.

Population 
In 2011 this area had a population of 9,295.
 
Source: Instituto Nacional de Estadística de Uruguay

References

External links 
INE map of Villa Crespo y San Andrés, Toledo, Fracc.Camino del Andaluz y R.84, Joaquín Suárez, Fracc.sobre Ruta 74, Villa San José, Villa San Felipe, Villa Hadita, Seis Hermanos and Villa Porvenir

Populated places in the Canelones Department